Violet May Cottrell (17 May 1887 – 28 May 1971) was a New Zealand writer, poet and spiritualist. She was born in Napier, Hawke's Bay, New Zealand on 17 May 1887.

References

1887 births
1971 deaths
New Zealand women poets
Spiritualists
20th-century New Zealand poets